Jardim Elétrico is the fourth album by the Brazilian Tropicália/psychedelic rock band Os Mutantes. The album was originally released in 1971 (see 1971 in music) on Polydor Records. The title in English means Electric Garden. Five of the songs from this album were originally intended to be released on the album Tecnicolor, but that album was not released until 2000.

The album also saw Arnaldo Baptista take over as the band's producer, a position he would maintain until he left the band in 1973.

It was listed by Rolling Stone Brazil at #72 on the 100 best Brazilian albums in history list.

Track listing

Personnel
Os Mutantes
 Arnaldo Baptista: vocals (tracks 2, 4, 5, 8), keyboards
 Rita Lee: vocals (tracks 1, 3, 4, 8, 10, 11), percussion
 Sérgio Dias: vocals (tracks 3, 4, 5, 6, 7, 8, 9, 10), guitars
 Liminha: bass, backing vocal, vocal (track 6)
 Dinho Leme: drums

with:
 Rogério Duprat: orchestral arrangements

References

1971 albums
Os Mutantes albums
Polydor Records albums
Albums produced by Arnaldo Baptista
Portuguese-language albums